is the most successful single by the Japanese band Janne Da Arc. It was released on January 19, 2005. The song Gekkouka was featured as the first opening song to the anime series Black Jack. A number two hit on the Japan Oricon charts, it was the twenty-second best-selling single of 2005.

Track listing
 "Gekkouka"
 "WING"
 "Gekkouka (Blackjack mix)"

References

2005 singles
Japanese songs
2005 songs
Song articles with missing songwriters